

The CAG Toxo is a Spanish two-seat ultralight cabin monoplane designed and built by Construcciones Aeronauticas de Galicia for amateur construction.

Design and development
The prototype Toxo ultralight first flew in 1999 and was a low-wing cantilever monoplane with fixed tricycle landing gear. The Toxo can be powered typically by a  Jabiru 3300 or a Rotax 914S engine. The cabin has two seats side-by-side with dual controls, each with a centerline-hinged upward-opening door.

Variants
Toxo
Variant approved as an ultralight

Toxo II
Variant approved in the VLA category.

Specifications (Toxo ultralight)

References

Notes

Bibliography

1990s Spanish civil utility aircraft
Homebuilt aircraft
Single-engined tractor aircraft
Light-sport aircraft
Low-wing aircraft
CAG aircraft
Aircraft first flown in 1999